Mari Klaup (born 27 February 1990) is an Estonian athlete who specialises in the heptathlon. She competed in the heptathlon event at the 2016 European Championships in Amsterdam, Netherlands. At the 2013 World Championships in Moscow she was 21st.

Personal bests

Outdoor

Indoor

References

External links 
 

1990 births
Living people
Estonian heptathletes
Sportspeople from Tartu
World Athletics Championships athletes for Estonia